The New South Wales Department of Education is a department of the Government of New South Wales. In addition to other responsibilities, it operates primary and secondary schools throughout the state.

 List of government schools in New South Wales: A–F
 List of government schools in New South Wales: G–P
 List of government schools in New South Wales: Q–Z

See also 
 List of schools in Australia

G